Suharril Fetri (born 7 May 1989) is a Malaysian cricketer. He was part of Malaysia's squad for the 2008 Under-19 Cricket World Cup. He played in the 2014 ICC World Cricket League Division Three tournament. In April 2018, he was named in Malaysia's squad for the 2018 ICC World Cricket League Division Four tournament, also in Malaysia. In August 2018, he was named in Malaysia's squad for the 2018 Asia Cup Qualifier tournament. In September 2019, he was named in Malaysia's squad for the 2019 Malaysia Cricket World Cup Challenge League A tournament. He made his List A debut for Malaysia, against Denmark, in the Cricket World Cup Challenge League A tournament on 16 September 2019.

References

External links
 

1989 births
Living people
Malaysian cricketers
Place of birth missing (living people)
Cricketers at the 2014 Asian Games
Southeast Asian Games gold medalists for Malaysia
Southeast Asian Games silver medalists for Malaysia
Southeast Asian Games medalists in cricket
Competitors at the 2017 Southeast Asian Games
Asian Games competitors for Malaysia